Mount Chaya, also known as Chaya Mountain, is a mountain, geological feature, scenic spot and tourist attraction in Zhumadian, Henan. It is one of the AAAAA Tourist Attractions of China, a list of the most important and best-maintained tourist attractions in the People's Republic of China.

History
Mount Chaya was occupied by rebel agrarian leader Shang Rang in 876CE during the Tang Dynasty, leading to a retreat of Tang forces back to Deng Prefecture in modern Nanyang, Henan. It is also the location where Shang Rang joined forces with fellow rebel leader Huang Chao later in the same year.

Geology
Mount Chaya is a granitic formation, composed of Yanshanian granite (formed 140 million to 120 mya). This granite displays interesting geomorphological features. It was designated a Geopark in 2004.

In Popular Culture
Mount Chaya was a filming location for CCTV's 1986 adaptation of Journey to the West.

Gallery

References

Geography of China
Geography of Henan
Mountains of Henan
Mountains of China
Tourist attractions in Henan